Maranchón is a municipality located in the province of Guadalajara, Castile-La Mancha, Spain. According to the 2004 census (INE), the municipality had a population of 244 inhabitants.

One of the biggest wind farms in Europe is located in the Maranchón municipal term, on top of the ridges of the Sierra de Solorio range. La Migaña is a local slang used mainly among cattle-herders.

Villages
Maranchón
Clares
Balbacil
Turmiel 
Codes

References

External links 
Maranchón municipal site

Municipalities in the Province of Guadalajara